The 2012–2013 season was FK Sarajevo's 64th season in history, and their 19th consecutive season in the top flight of Bosnian football.

Players
Source:

Squad

(Captain)

(C)

Statistics

Kit

Friendlies

Želimir Vidović Cup

Competitions

Premier League

League table

Matches

Cup of Bosnia and Herzegovina

Round of 32

Round of 16

UEFA Europa League

First qualifying round

Second qualifying round

Third qualifying round

References

FK Sarajevo seasons
Sarajevo